Třebusice is a municipality and village in Kladno District in the Central Bohemian Region of the Czech Republic. It has about 500 inhabitants.

Administrative parts
The village of Holousy is an administrative part of Třebusice.

References

Villages in Kladno District